Lee Chun-soo (born 9 July 1981) is a retired South Korean football player. He played as a forward for the South Korea national team at the 2002 and 2006  editions of the 
FIFA World Cup.

Club career

Ulsan Hyundai Horang-i 
Lee recorded seven goals and nine assists during 18 appearances in the 2002 K League, showing his talent in his first professional season. After becoming a World Cup semi-finalist and the top assist provider of the K League at the tender age of 19, he was named the Asian Young Footballer of the Year by the Asian Football Confederation.

In July 2003, he joined Real Sociedad, the runners-up of the 2002–03 La Liga, becoming the first Korean to play in La Liga. However, after a mediocre season, he was loaned out to fellow La Liga side Numancia, and ultimately returned to South Korea. He was unable to score in the La Liga in his two years there.

Lee failed in Spain due to the difference in level between the La Liga and the K League, but he was still one of the best South Korean footballers. Although he rejoined Ulsan in mid-season, his performance was invaluable for the capture of the 2005 league. He especially scored a hat trick in the first leg of the championship final. He was subsequently named the K League's Most Valuable Player.

The next year, he left a memorable game against Gamba Osaka at the A3 Champions Cup. He played only 45 minutes of the game due to a cold, but scored a hat-trick.

Feyenoord 
In the summer of 2008, Lee joined Feyenoord of the Eredivisie. He got the second chance to play in Europe, but failed to adapt to the Netherlands. While he competed in Feyenoord, he was scammed in his country, and took a two-week vacation to solve the problem. He had difficulty concentrating on football due to his case of fraud, and Feyenoord officially announced Lee's loan to South Korean team Suwon Samsung Bluewings on a one-year deal in July 2008.

Loan spells 
Even in Suwon, his stint was ill-received: he performed poorly, had clashes with the coaching staff, and was banished from the K League. After a few months, Suwon released him from the banishment, and he could be loaned to Jeonnam Dragons on 26 February 2009.

In June 2009, he claimed he couldn't reject his transfer according to his contract with Feyenoord if another club suggest a high salary to him, and he joined a Saudi club Al-Nassr in the middle of the season. However, the dual contract did not exist in reality, and he was prohibited from joining the K League again after Jeonnam got to know the truth.

Incheon United 
In March 2010, he left Al-Nassr because the club did not give his wages for three months. He joined a J1 League club Omiya Ardija, and played in Japan for a year and a half.

After leaving Omiya Ardija, Lee did not join any foreign professional club for a year, and hoped to play in South Korea. Jeonnam Dragons released his indefinite banishment after watching his behavior including three apologies at the stadium. On 31 March 2013, he came back to the K League with Incheon United in a game against Daejeon Citizen 1,381 days after the last game with Jeonnam.

On 5 November 2015, he announced his retirement as a player. His retirement ceremony was held at half time of a World Cup qualifier between South Korea and Lebanon in March 2016.

International career
In 1999, Lee was selected for the South Korean under-20 team, participating in the Bangabandhu Cup. He scored five goals against Thailand in his debut game, and also scored both goals in a 2–0 win over Brazil.

Lee was also a member of the South Korean under-23 team in the 2000 Summer Olympics. In a group match against Morocco, he almost missed a crucial penalty, but succeeded in scoring from the rebound.

In the 2002 FIFA World Cup held in his country, Lee was a substitute of the South Korean national team, but showed good dribbles and defense when appearing. After main players were injured, Lee got an opportunity as a starter in the semi-finals against Germany. In this game, however, he was criticised for displaying a greediness for goal with little regard for teamwork, although he made a memorable shot saved by Oliver Kahn.

Unlike in the 2002 World Cup, Lee played as a starter in the 2006 FIFA World Cup. He scored South Korea's first goal with a free kick against Togo in a 2–1 win.

After retirement 
In 2005, he took a special seminar at Goyang Baekyang Middle School with Chung Mong-joon, president of the Korea Football Association.

In June 2014, he starred in an SNL Korea episode, when he played a parody of the game Pro Evolution Soccer 2014 called "GTA Winner Eleven 2014" alongside Kim Min-kyo.

In December 2015, he appeared on the King of Mask Singer show and displayed his singing skills.

As of March 2016, he is a commentator for JTBC3 Fox Sports.

In June 2021, Lee signed a contract with DH Entertainment.

Career statistics

Club

International

Results list South Korea's goal tally first.

Filmography

Television

Web series

Honours

Player
Ulsan Hyundai Horang-i
K League 1: 2005
Korean League Cup: 2007
Korean Super Cup: 2006
A3 Champions Cup: 2006

Feyenoord
KNVB Cup: 2007–08

Suwon Samsung Bluewings
K League 1: 2008
Korean League Cup: 2008

Incheon United
Korean FA Cup runner-up: 2015

South Korea U23
Asian Games bronze medal: 2002

South Korea
FIFA World Cup fourth place: 2002
AFC Asian Cup third place: 2007

Individual
K League 1 top assist provider: 2002
K League Rookie of the Year: 2002
K League 1 Best XI: 2002, 2005
AFC Youth Player of the Year: 2002
K League 1 Most Valuable Player: 2005
A3 Champions Cup Most Valuable Player: 2006
A3 Champions Cup top goalscorer: 2006
AFC Asian Cup Team of the Tournament: 2007
Korean FA Goal of the Year: 2007

Entertainer

References

External links 

 
 Lee Chun-soo – National Team Stats at KFA 
 
 

1981 births
Living people
Ulsan Hyundai FC players
Real Sociedad footballers
CD Numancia players
Feyenoord players
Suwon Samsung Bluewings players
Jeonnam Dragons players
Al Nassr FC players
Omiya Ardija players
Incheon United FC players
K League 1 Most Valuable Player Award winners
K League 1 players
La Liga players
Eredivisie players
J1 League players
2007 AFC Asian Cup players
2006 FIFA World Cup players
Footballers at the 2004 Summer Olympics
2002 CONCACAF Gold Cup players
2002 FIFA World Cup players
2000 AFC Asian Cup players
Footballers at the 2000 Summer Olympics
Olympic footballers of South Korea
Expatriate footballers in Spain
Expatriate footballers in the Netherlands
Expatriate footballers in Saudi Arabia
Expatriate footballers in Japan
South Korean expatriate sportspeople in Spain
South Korean expatriate sportspeople in the Netherlands
South Korean expatriate sportspeople in Saudi Arabia
South Korean expatriate sportspeople in Japan
South Korean expatriate footballers
South Korea international footballers
South Korean footballers
Association football wingers
Sportspeople from Incheon
Korea University alumni
Asian Young Footballer of the Year winners
Asian Games medalists in football
Footballers at the 2002 Asian Games
Footballers at the 2006 Asian Games
Asian Games bronze medalists for South Korea
Medalists at the 2002 Asian Games
Saudi Professional League players